The Peace Myanmar Group (also known as PMG), is a leading Myanmar corporation in distribution, alcoholic beverages and bottled drinking water. The company has been in operation since June 24th, 1993.

Organization 
Peace Myanmar Group was founded by three Burmese businessmen, U Tun Linn, U Thein Win and U Min Aung on 24 June 1993. The major shareholders are the three executive directors. The alcohol distillery, water factory and the headquarters are located in the country’s largest city, Yangon, while other branches spread nationwide.

History 
Founded in 1993, the company established its distillery in part to provide an alternative to counterfeit liquor market. In the following year 1994, it set up a purified bottled drinking water factory to bring to market quality drinking water. The company expanded in 2001 by adding distillery capacity and installed an AFC Boiler to reduce air pollution. Recognized again for its quality assurance and environmental management, PMG received its ISO 9001:2000 Certificate in 2003. PMG is one of the first consumer manufacturing companies to receive an ISO certification in Myanmar.

In 2007, it was reported by The Irrawaddy that it, among many other major private companies at the time like Max Myanmar and International Beverages Trading, would be targeted by the Burmese government for tax evasion. However, none of the companies were found to be guilty. PMG Group, along with Myanmar Brewery Ltd and International Beverages Trading Co., Ltd and Pe were three of the major advertisers of alcohol, until a ban on such advertisements in print and broadcast media was instituted by the Burmese government in 2010.

Criticism 
PMG was allegedly founded by Yang Mao-liang, a Kokang warlord and head of a rebel group, the Myanmar National Democratic Alliance Army (MNDAA) and helped launder black money for the MNDAA. The allegations first appeared in 1998 in an Asia Week article titled “Business Is Blooming”. In 2020, the company issued a statement to deny these allegations, which resurfaced long after the 1998 article was published.

According to the statement, PMG stated that “at no level in the business does PMG have any commercial, familial, personal, professional, physical or any other ties with this individual or the MNDAA”. The statement goes on to say that PMG was founded by U Tun Linn, U Thein Win and U Min Aung in 1993 on June 24 as seen in the certificate of incorporation and shareholder documents, using money from existing legitimate businesses.

PMG also argued that the allegation in the 1998 article was built on information that could not be verified, but nevertheless was published as verified fact, with the two original authors unable to obtain material evidence from their sources. PMG claimed that the authors and their sources might have only had a low level of knowledge of PMG itself, as they erroneously attributed “several energy drinks” and a whisky called “Highland Pride” to the company – neither of which has ever been produced in the history of the business.

PMG said it was not contacted for an opportunity to respond to this article before it was published and that the article and its allegations, written in English language, spread for years from its publication undiscovered by its entirely Myanmar speaking organization until much later. The company’s leadership was unequipped to address the article and its inaccuracies effectively under those previous conditions.

Corporate social responsibility 
PMG has supported the communities of the country, conducting several corporate social responsibility programs under its “Nyein Chan Myanmar” (Peace Myanmar) initiative since 2014. Regular blood donations, contributions towards disabilities and autism associations, natural disaster affected peoples and other activates are conducted as needed. When the global pandemic COVID-19 struck Myanmar, PMG supported the country’s government in an effort to protect its vulnerable population. The company donated thousands of bottled waters to quarantine centers and helped others to make their donations convenient, managing the transportation and donation with PMG staff.

Awards 
PMG was recognized by the Myanmar government as 5th Highest Commercial taxpayer for the 2011-2012 Fiscal Year, 73rd Commercial taxpayer for the 2014-2015 Fiscal Year, 322nd Income taxpayer for the 2014-2015 Fiscal Year and 12th Special Goods taxpayer for the 2017-2018 Fiscal Year.

Other awards 
The company also received prestigious domestic and international awards including a Gold medal in Best Career Advancement program, Bronze medal in Best Use of Internal Marketing for Company pride and Finalist for Overall Best of the Best.

Quality awards 
In recognition of its products’ quality, PMG also clinched the Grand Gold medal in Monde Selection, Three Stars award for iTQi Superior Taste, Best of Class Platinum award for SIP, Silver medal in San Francisco World Spirit Award and Bronze medal in London Spirit Competition.

References 

Conglomerate companies of Myanmar
Food and drink companies established in 1993
Holding companies established in 1993
1993 establishments in Myanmar